Garth David Mulroy (born 8 July 1978) is a South African professional golfer.

Amateur career
Mulroy was born in Durban. He attended college in the United States at North Carolina State University, where he was an NCAA Division I All-American. He turned professional in 2002.

Professional career
Mulroy has predominantly tried to make his way as a professional in the United States, and has collected several victories on various mini-tours. He finished tied for 64th at the PGA Tour qualifying school at the end of 2006, earning a place on the Nationwide Tour for 2007. He has played on the second tier United States based tour since then, winning for the first time in April 2009 when he secured a one stroke victory over Chris Tidland at the South Georgia Classic. In 2009, he finished 14th on the money list to earn his 2010 PGA Tour card.

Mulroy has also competed on the Southern Africa-based Sunshine Tour. After winning his place on the tour at the 2007 qualifying school, he tied for 3rd in the South African Airways Open at the end of the year. He maintained that form into the 2008 season, as he won two minor tournaments and missed out in a playoff for the Joburg Open, one of the richer European Tour co-sanctioned events. He ended the year in second place on the Order of Merit behind Richard Sterne, who won all three European Tour co-sanctioned events.

A shaky 2010 season cost Mulroy his PGA Tour card, as he made six cuts in 19 events. He won the Nationwide Tour's BMW Charity Pro-Am in 2011. After struggling to maintain his Tour status stateside, Mulroy focused mainly on the Sunshine Tour and European Tour.

Professional wins (8)

European Tour wins (1)

1Co-sanctioned by the Sunshine Tour

European Tour playoff record (0–1)

Sunshine Tour wins (4)

1Co-sanctioned by the European Tour

Sunshine Tour playoff record (0–1)

Nationwide Tour wins (2)

Nationwide Tour playoff record (1–0)

Other wins (2)
2005 Big Stakes Match Play Championship (with David Ping)
2008 Gary Player Invitational (with Bobby Lincoln)

Results in major championships

CUT = missed the half-way cut
"T" = tied

Results in World Golf Championships

"T" = Tied

See also
2009 Nationwide Tour graduates
2011 Nationwide Tour graduates

References

External links

South African male golfers
NC State Wolfpack men's golfers
Sunshine Tour golfers
PGA Tour golfers
Asian Tour golfers
European Tour golfers
Korn Ferry Tour graduates
Sportspeople from Durban
White South African people
1978 births
Living people